Secora is Norwegian government enterprise created in 2005 to perform construction work on water transport infrastructure, both sea lanes and ports. The company was originally part of Kystverket, that is responsible for water transport infrastructure. Secora is based in Svolvær and has 90 employees.

References

External links
 Secora web site

Construction and civil engineering companies of Norway
Government-owned companies of Norway
Organizations established in 2005
Companies based in Nordland
Norwegian companies established in 2005
Construction and civil engineering companies established in 2005